Troy Simmonds (born 13 July 1978) is a former Australian rules footballer who played for Melbourne, Fremantle and Richmond in the Australian Football League.

AFL career

Melbourne: 1999 – 2001
Simmonds was first drafted by Melbourne in the 1999 pre-season draft. He played only five 5 games in 1999 but then played 22 in 2000, including the Grand Final, during which he was carried from the field on a stretcher following a head-on charge by Essendon's Michael Long.

Fremantle: 2002 – 2004
In 2002 he was traded to Fremantle as part of a three way trade that included Daniel Bandy moving to the Western Bulldogs and Craig Ellis moving to Melbourne.  This was seen as a chance for Simmonds to become Fremantle's main ruckman, as opposed to being Jeff White's understudy at Melbourne.  In three seasons at Fremantle Simmonds played in 64 out of a possible 67 games, including Fremantle's first ever finals game in 2003.

Richmond: 2005 – 2010
At the end of the 2004 season, Simmonds was traded back to Victoria, again in a three-way deal, with Heath Black returning to Fremantle, Aaron Fiora moving to St Kilda and Simmonds moving to Richmond.  In a move surprising to many, Simmonds signed a five-year deal with the Tigers, as opposed to the usual two or three-year contracts. After a serviceable first year with Richmond, Simmonds played some of the best football of his career in 2006 - taking several big marks and scoring several goals up forward. At the end of 2009 Simmonds signed a one-year contract for the 2010 season. Prior to Round 10, 2010, Simmonds announced his retirement.

References

External links

Living people
1978 births
Richmond Football Club players
Melbourne Football Club players
Fremantle Football Club players
Box Hill Football Club players
Coburg Football Club players
Australian rules footballers from Melbourne